This is the discography of Tom Morello, an American rock guitarist most known for his work with the bands Rage Against the Machine, Audioslave, Street Sweeper Social Club and as his folk alter-ego The Nightwatchman. Morello started playing guitar in the mid 80's in the band Electric Sheep together with future Tool guitarist Adam Jones on bass. After graduating cum laude from Harvard University in 1986 with a BA in political science, he moved to Los Angeles, where he briefly worked as an aide to Senator Alan Cranston. Later Adam Jones moved to L.A. as well; Morello introduced Jones and Maynard James Keenan to Danny Carey, who would come to form the band Tool. In the late 80's Morello was recruited to replace original guitar player Mike Livingston in the rock band Lock Up, in 1989 the band released its only album Something Bitchin' This Way Comes. In 1991 Morello left Lock Up to start a new band, after being impressed by Zack de la Rocha freestyle rapping he invited him to join his band, he also drafted Brad Wilk who had previously auditioned as a drummer for Lock Up. After Zack convinced his childhood friend Tim Commerford to join as the band's bass player the line up was complete.

The band released their self-titled debut album Rage Against the Machine in 1992, which became a commercial success, leading to a slot at Lollapalooza in 1993. Four years later the band released their follow-up record Evil Empire. The band's third album The Battle of Los Angeles was released in 1999. During their initial nine-year run, they became one of the most popular and influential political bands in contemporary music. After the band break up in 2000, the band released their fourth studio album Renegades, which is composed entirely of cover songs. Vocalist Zack de la Rocha started a low-key solo career; while Morello and the rest of the band formed the rock supergroup Audioslave with former Soundgarden frontman Chris Cornell.

Audioslave released their self-titled debut album in 2002, critics initially described Audioslave as an amalgamation of Rage Against the Machine and Soundgarden, but with the band's second album, Out of Exile, noted that the band had established its own separate identity. The band's trademark sound was created by blending 1970s hard rock with 1990s grunge. Morello also incorporated his well-known, unconventional guitar solos into the band's sound. After Audioslave released three successful albums, received three Grammy nominations, and became the first American rock band to perform an open-air concert in Cuba, Cornell issued a statement in February 2007 that he was permanently leaving the band "due to irresolvable personality conflicts as well as musical differences". 
 
After a seven-year hiatus, Rage Against the Machine reunited in January 2007 at the Coachella Festival and have has continued to perform at multiple live venues since, however, according to Morello, Rage Against the Machine has no plans to record new material.

In 2003 Morello created the identity of The Nightwatchman, an "artist of the people," when a desire to return to political activism in his music struck him, after over a year of playing non-activist rock in Audioslave. Morello first began playing political acoustic folk music in a Los Angeles coffeehouse before a small crowd, and soon after went on Billy Bragg's Tell Us the Truth tour. Late 2008 Morello released his second studio album The Fabled City, which features guest appearances by Serj Tankian, Shooter Jennings and Perry Farrell.

Album appearances

Collaborations

References

External links

Official Nightwatchman Website

Rock music discographies
Discographies of American artists